Stein is a municipality and a town in the southeastern Netherlands.

The municipality of Stein makes part of the region of South Limburg and lies between the city of Geleen in the east and Beek in the southeast, and lies furthermore west of interchange Kerensheide and the chemical industries of Chemelot. To the west lies the Belgian border, across the Meuse river. In comparison to other cities and villages in the area, Stein is fairly big. It is also the capital city of the municipality with the same name. It has i.a. three Roman Catholic churches, an abandoned mediaeval castle, and a port to the Juliana Canal which used to be the second largest inland port in all of Europe.

On 29 October 2009, the shopping mall of Stein suffered a severe fire. As a result of the calamity, the town subsequently lost 40 shops, 2 banks, 1 restaurant and 6 houses. The adjacent, iconic, 11-story apartment building 'De Stevel', remained intact.

Population centres
 Berg aan de Maas (Berg)
 Catsop (Katsep)
 Elsloo (Aelse)
 Maasband (Maasbendj)
 Meers (Meas)
 Nattenhoven (Nattenoave)
 Stein (Stein)
 Urmond (Uermend, Wermend)

(Local language in parentheses.)

Notable people 
 Sjefke Janssen (1919 in Elsloo – 2014) a Dutch professional road bicycle racer
 Manfred Naumann (born 1933) a German marathon runner, competed at the 1964 Summer Olympics
 René Lotz (born 1938) a retired Dutch cyclist, competed at the 1960 Summer Olympics
 Mia Gommers (born 1939) a retired Dutch athlete, who competed mainly in the 800 metres; bronze medallist at the 1968 Summer Olympics
 Harry Steevens (born 1945 in Elsloo) a retired Dutch cyclist
 Henk Temmink (born 1952 in Elsloo) a Dutch chess player
 Frank Dikötter (born 1961) a Dutch historian who specialises in modern China
 Silvia Pepels (born 1975) is a triathlon athlete, competed at the first Olympic triathlon at the 2000 Summer Olympics

See also
Obbicht en Papenhoven

References

External links

Official website

 
Populated places in Limburg (Netherlands)
Municipalities of Limburg (Netherlands)
South Limburg (Netherlands)